Swami Vivekananda represented India and Hinduism at the Parliament of the World's Religions (1893). 
India Celebrates National youth day on birth anniversary of the Great Swami.
This was the first World's Parliament of Religions, and it was held from 11 to 27 September 1893. Delegates from all over the world joined this Parliament. In 2012 a three-day world conference was organized to commemorate 150th birth anniversary of Vivekananda.

Background

Journey to the west 
With funds collected by his Madras disciples, the kings of Mysore, Ramnad, Khetri, diwans and other followers, Narendra left Bombay for Chicago on 31 May 1893 with the name "Vivekananda" which was suggested by Ajit Singh of Khetri. The name "Vivekananda" meant "the bliss of discerning wisdom".

Vivekananda began his journey to America from Bombay, India on 31 May 1893, on the ship named peninsula His journey to America took him to China, Japan and Canada. At Canton (Guangzhou) he saw some Buddhist monasteries. Then he visited Japan. First he went to Nagasaki. He saw three more big cities and then reached Osaka, Kyoto and Tokyo, and then he reached Yokohama. He started his journey to Canada in a ship named RMS Empress of India from Yokohama.

 Meeting with Jamsetji Tata 
In the journey from Yokohama to Canada on the ship Empress, Vivekananda accidentally met Jamsetji Tata who was also going to Chicago. Tata, a businessman who made his initial fortune in the opium trade with China and started one of the first textile mills in India, was going to Chicago to get new business ideas. In this accidental meeting on the Empress'', Vivekananda inspired Tata to set up a research and educational institution in India. They also discussed a plan to start a steel factory in India.

He reached Vancouver on 25 July. From Vancouver (of Canada) he travelled to Chicago by train and arrived there on Sunday, 30 July 1893.

Journey to Boston 
After reaching Chicago, Vivekananda learned no one could attend the Parliament as delegate without credential or bona fide. He did not have one at that moment and felt utterly disappointed. He also learned the Parliament would not open until first week of September. But Vivekananda did not give up his hope. To cut his expenditure, he decided to go to Boston, which was less costly than Chicago.

Meeting with John Henry Wright 
At Boston, Vivekananda met Professor John Henry Wright of Harvard University. Professor Wright invited Vivekananda to give a lecture at the university. After being acquainted with Vivekananda's knowledge, wisdom and excellence, Professor Wright insisted him to represent Hinduism at the Parliament of World's Religions. Vivekananda himself later wrote– "He urged upon me the necessity of going to the Parliament of Religions, which he thought would give an introduction to the nation". When Wright learned that Vivekananda was not officially accredited and did not have any credential to join the Parliament, he told Vivekananda– "To ask for your credentials is like asking the sun to state its right to shine in the heavens."

At the World's Parliament of Religions

Response to Welcome (11 September 1893)
The World's Parliament of Religions started on 11 September 1893 at the Permanent Memorial Art Palace (also identified as the World's Congress Auxiliary Building), now the Art Institute of Chicago, as part of the World's Columbian Exposition. Vivekananda gave his first lecture on that day. Towards the afternoon his turn came, after so much of procrastination. Though initially nervous, he bowed to Saraswati, the Hindu goddess of learning, and he felt he got new energy in his body; he felt someone or something else had occupied his body– "The Soul of India, the echo of the Rishis, the voice of Ramakrishna, the mouthpiece of the resurgent Time spirit". Then began his speech with salutation, "Sisters and brothers of America!".

Why we disagree (15 September 1893)

In this speech, Vivekananda tried to explain the reason of disagreement between each other and different sects and religions. He told a story of a frog, which is popularly known as (koop mandook). And in the story he told, a frog used to live in a well. It was born there and brought up there, and it used to think his well was the biggest water land of the world. One day, a frog from a sea came to that well. When the frog from the sea told the frog of the well that the sea is much bigger than that well, the frog of the well did not believe it and drove the frog of the sea away from his well. Vivekananda concluded– "That has been the difficulty all the while. I am a Hindu. I am sitting in my own little well and thinking that the whole world is my little well. The Christian sits in his little well and thinks the whole world is his well. The Muslim sits in his little well and thinks that is the whole world."

Paper on Hinduism (19 September 1893)

Vivekananda gave a short introduction of Hinduism and spoke on "The meaning of the Hindu religion". He also talked about the 3 oldest religions of the world, namely Hinduism, Zoroastrianism and Judaism and their survival and the emergence of Christianity. He then went ahead and shared his knowledge of the Vedanta philosophy, the concept of god, soul and body in Hinduism.

Religion not the Crying need of India (20 September 1893)

In this brief address, Vivekananda made a "little criticism" and told, religion was not the most important need of Indians at that moment. He regretted for sending of Christian missionaries and trying to save the souls of Indians, although poverty had been a much more important issue at that time. He then told, his aim was to join the Chicago Parliament of Religions and to seek aid for his impoverished people.

Buddhism, the Fulfillment of Hinduism (26 September 1893)

In this speech, Vivekananda talked on Buddhism. He talked about origin of Buddhism, relation between Buddhism and Brahmanism, Buddhism and Vedas. He concluded, "Hinduism cannot live without Buddhism, nor Buddhism without Hinduism." and showed how Buddhism is the fulfillment to Hinduism.

Address at the Final Session (27 September 1893)

This was Vivekananda's final address at the Parliament of World's religion. In his last speech, he told that the Parliament had become an accomplished fact. He thanked the "noble souls" for organizing the Parliament which he felt "proved to the world that holiness, purity and charity are not the exclusive possessions of any church in the world, and that every system has produced men and women of the most exalted character". He finished his speech with appeal "Help and not Fight," "Assimilation and not Destruction," "Harmony and Peace and not Dissension.".

Impact

Parliament of the World's Religions (2012) 
In 2012, a three-day world conference was organised by the Institute of World Religions (of the Washington Kali Temple), Burtonsville, Maryland, in association with the Council for A Parliament of World Religions, Chicago, Illinois to commemorate the 150th birth anniversary of Vivekananda.

See also 
 Bibliography of Swami Vivekananda

References

External links 

 Addresses at The Parliament of Religions at Archive.org
Addresses at The Parliament of Religions (The Complete Works of Swami) at Wikisource

Swami Vivekananda
1893 in Illinois